Spilonota is a worldwide genus of moths belonging to the subfamily Olethreutinae of the family Tortricidae.

Species
Spilonota acrosema (Turner, 1946)
Spilonota albicana (Motschulsky, 1866)
Spilonota albitegulana Kuznetzov, 1997
Spilonota allodapa Diakonoff, 1953
Spilonota aphrocymba Meyrick, 1927
Spilonota babylonica Meyrick, 1912
Spilonota calceata (Meyrick, 1907)
Spilonota chlorotripta Meyrick, 1921
Spilonota conica Meyrick, 1911
Spilonota constrictana (Meyrick, 1881)
Spilonota cryptogramma Meyrick, 1922
Spilonota dissoplaca (Meyrick, 1936)
Spilonota distyliana Moriuti, 1958
Spilonota eremitana Moriuti, 1972
Spilonota grandlacia Razowski, 2013
Spilonota hexametra Meyrick, 1920
Spilonota incretata Meyrick, 1931
Spilonota laricana (Heinemann, 1863)
Spilonota lechriaspis Meyrick, 1932
Spilonota lobata Diakonoff, 1953
Spilonota melanacta (Meyrick, 1907)
Spilonota mortuana (Walker, 1863)
Spilonota ocellana ([Denis & Schiffermuller], 1775)
Spilonota prognathana (Snellen, 1883)
Spilonota pyrochlora Diakonoff, 1953
Spilonota pyrusicola Liu & Liu, 1994
Spilonota quietana (Meyrick, 1881)
Spilonota ruficomana (Meyrick, 1881)
Spilonota selene Diakonoff, 1953
Spilonota semirufana (Christoph, 1882)
Spilonota sinuosa Meyrick, 1917
Spilonota terenia Razowski, 2013
Spilonota trilithopa (Meyrick in Caradja & Meyrick, 1937)

Former species
Spilonota melanocopa (Meyrick, 1912)

See also
List of Tortricidae genera

References

External links
tortricidae.com

Eucosmini
Tortricidae genera
Taxa named by James Francis Stephens